The 2012 Judo Grand Prix Qingdao was held in Qingdao, China from 24 to 25 November 2012.

Medal summary

Men's events

Women's events

Source Results

Medal table

References

External links
 

2012 IJF World Tour
2012 Judo Grand Prix
Judo
Judo competitions in China
Judo
Judo